The site of Old Hannastown is a historic archaeological site located at Hempfield Township, Westmoreland County, Pennsylvania. The village of Hannastown was laid out and originally settled in 1768–1769.  It consisted of 30 log houses, 2 taverns, and a garrison palisaded fort.  It was the site of the first English court administering justice west of the Alleghenies between 1773 and 1787.  It was destroyed by fire by the Senecas and English in 1782, and considered one of the last hostile acts of the American Revolution.  A "little Declaration of Independence" known as the "Hannastown Resolves" was adopted on May 16, 1775.

It was added to the National Register of Historic Places in 1972.

References

Archaeological sites in Pennsylvania
National Register of Historic Places in Pennsylvania
Buildings and structures in Westmoreland County, Pennsylvania
National Register of Historic Places in Westmoreland County, Pennsylvania